Mikel Janku (25 December 1941 - 10 January 2019) was an Albanian retired football player, who was a goalkeeper for Partizani Tiranë and the Albania national team between 1962–1969 and 1964–1967, respectively.

Club career
Janku was trained from 1958 as a helicopter pilot in Rostov, Soviet Union, and played for army club Partizani on his return to Albania.

International career
He made his debut for Albania in a May 1964 FIFA World Cup qualification match away against the Netherlands and earned a total of 9 caps, scoring no goals. His final international was a May 1967 European Championship qualification match against Yugoslavia.

Personal life
Janku later became a sports journalist for Sport Express and died in January 2019.

Honours
Albanian Superliga: 2
 1963, 1964

References

External links

1941 births
2019 deaths
Association football goalkeepers
Albanian footballers
Albania international footballers
FK Partizani Tirana players
Kategoria Superiore players